Ambalapara is a gram panchayat in the Palakkad district, state of Kerala, India. It is the local government organisation that serves the villages of Ambalapara-I and Ambalapara-II, and forms a part of the Ottapalam taluk.

Demographics
Ambalappara has a population of 34, 969 people.  According to bureaucratic niceties, Ambalapara-I has 12,418 people and Ambalapara-II has 22,551 people.

Post office
Ambalappara has a post office and the pin-code is 679512.

References 

Gram panchayats in Palakkad district